Paratrachichthys macleayi, also known as the Australian sandpaper fish, is a slimehead belonging to the family Trachichthyidae. It is endemic to southeastern Australia and can be found in small schools in open rocky reefs from depths of 15m to 400m.

References

Fish described in 1881
macleayi
Fish of Australia